"Yo Visto Así" (English: "I Dress Like This") is a song by Puerto Rican rapper Bad Bunny. It was released on November 27, 2020 through Rimas Entertainment as the second single from Bad Bunny's third solo studio album, El Último Tour Del Mundo.

Music video
Directed by Bad Bunny and Stillz, the music video for "Yo Visto Así" premiered on November 27, 2020 along with the release of Bad Bunny's third solo studio album, El Último Tour Del Mundo. The video opens with a shot of the truck shown on the cover of El Último Tour Del Mundo and continues to move on into Bad Bunny in a skatepark with graffiti of what represents his second solo studio album YHLQMDLG (2020). The video proceeds to a photoshoot scene featuring cameos of many celebrities including Ricky Martin, Ruby Rose, Luka Sabbat, Sofia Vergara, Hugo Flores, Sech, Karol G, Francisco Lindor, Bad Bunny’s brother, and more. The video closes with shots of Bad Bunny in an empty stadium.

Charts

Certifications

References

External links

2020 songs
2020 singles
Bad Bunny songs
Songs written by Bad Bunny
Spanish-language songs
rock songs
spanish rock songs